Sergey Zakharenko (born 19 September 1974) is a Belarusian skier. He competed in the Nordic combined events at the 1994 Winter Olympics, the 1998 Winter Olympics and the 2002 Winter Olympics.

References

External links
 

1974 births
Living people
Belarusian male Nordic combined skiers
Olympic Nordic combined skiers of Belarus
Nordic combined skiers at the 1994 Winter Olympics
Nordic combined skiers at the 1998 Winter Olympics
Nordic combined skiers at the 2002 Winter Olympics
People from Mogilev
Sportspeople from Mogilev Region